Intertwingularity is a term coined by Ted Nelson to express the complexity of interrelations in human knowledge.

Nelson wrote in Computer Lib/Dream Machines : "EVERYTHING IS DEEPLY INTERTWINGLED. In an important sense there are no "subjects" at all; there is only all knowledge, since the cross-connections among the myriad topics of this world simply cannot be divided up neatly."

He added the following comment in the revised edition  : "Hierarchical and sequential structures, especially popular since Gutenberg, are usually forced and artificial. Intertwingularity is not generally acknowledged—people keep pretending they can make things hierarchical, categorizable and sequential when they can't."

Intertwingularity is related to Nelson's coined term hypertext, partially inspired by "As We May Think" (1945) by Vannevar Bush.

Influence 
Peter Morville, an influential figure in information architecture, discusses intertwingularity in some of his books. In Ambient Findability: What We Find Changes Who We Become (2005), Morville uses the concept of intertwingularity to describe the experience of using hypertext on the web and starting to use computers embedded in everyday objects, known as ubiquitous computing. In 2014, he published a book called Intertwingled: Information Changes Everything about the intertwingularity of the universe, crediting Nelson with the word. 

David Weinberger wrote about intertwingularity in Everything Is Miscellaneous: The Power of the New Digital Disorder in 2008, explaining that providing unique identifiers for items helps enable intertwingularity.

The concept of intertwingularity was celebrated at the "Intertwingled: The Work and Influence of Ted Nelson" conference on April 14, 2014 at Chapman University. The organizers published a book called Intertwingled: The Work and Influence of Ted Nelson in 2015, with articles about Nelson's work and legacy. One of the organizers of the conference and editors of the book, Douglas Dechow, said, "In the 1960s, he saw a world of networked, interlinked – intertwingled, if you will – documents where all of the world’s knowledge is able to interact and intermingle[...] He was the first, or among the first, people to have that idea."

See also 
Connectedness
Directed graph
Multicategory
Multiclass classification, Multicriteria classification, Multi-label classification
Multigraph
Multiple inheritance
Polysemy

References

External links 
 blue sky: miscellaneous by Jamie Zawinski
 Intertwingly - Sam Ruby's blog named for this concept

Ted Nelson
Knowledge